Freedom Beast is the alias of Dominic Mndawe, a fictional comic book character in the DC Universe.

Fictional character biography
Freedom Beast was born Dominic Mndawe in South Africa. His first appearance was in Animal Man #13 which occurs during the rule of apartheid in South Africa. Dominic was under arrest for taking pictures of racially motivated acts of violence being committed by white Afrikaner policemen. In a cell, Dominic was about to be killed by his captors when he is rescued by Animal Man and B'wana Beast (Mike Maxwell), Mndawe's predecessor and future mentor.

After the rescue, Maxwell gives Mndawe the elixir and helmet that confer powers on their owner. The two briefly had a disagreement as Mndawe was adamant to continue his political resistance to the South African government and its policy of apartheid with while Maxwell was insistent that the calling is apolitical. However, they eventually reconciled on this point. Mndawe continued pursuing his political objectives which he justified with the personal maxim, "Today's politics is tomorrow's mythology".

His powers include mind control and the ability to fuse two or more animals into one hybrid beast under the control of Freedom Beast.

Animal Man and Freedom Beast then prevent the massacre of a group of peaceful demonstrators by Afrikaner police. Animal Man returns to the US, while Maxwell and Freedom Beast remain in South Africa.

Mike Maxwell returns in Animal Man #47 (May 1992). He was being controlled by an evil force,  the Antagon, and transformed into the Shining Man. He perishes in the ensuing battle.

Animal Man and Dominic team up once again during the Day of Judgement incident, protecting African wildlife from the murderous intentions of demon invaders.

Further appearances

Freedom Beast appears in the Day of Vengeance Infinite Crisis Special, in which he was possessed by Rage, one of the Seven Deadly Sins. He is also seen at the gathering of mystics at Stonehenge in Infinite Crisis #6.

Freedom Beast reappeared as South Africa's representative in the reformed Global Guardians in Green Lantern v4 #11 and 14–17. He and his teammates were brainwashed by the Faceless Hunter and used as weapons against Green Lantern (Hal Jordan). The Global Guardians were eventually freed, and Freedom Beast returned with them in Checkmate v2 #24 and #29–31.

In Final Crisis #4, Freedom Beast was seen fighting off a controlled Gorilla Grodd on Watchtower 4 in Gorilla City.

In Justice League: Cry for Justice #1, Freedom Beast is killed by minions of Prometheus. Dominic's partner Congorilla discovers his dying friend and vows to find justice for his murder. Prometheus is subsequently killed by Green Arrow in issue #7 of the same series.

In Justice League of America #60, Congorilla mentions that he still has Dominic's helmet and elixir in his possession. Seeking to honor the memory of his old friend, Congorilla ultimately resigns from the Justice League and goes to find a worthy candidate to become the new Freedom Beast. In Justice League International #1, a character alongside Congorilla appears wearing the mask, referencing Congorilla had found a successor. The identity of this character is unknown.

New 52
In The New 52, Freedom Beast is alive, making his debut when he comes to America to take down a hunting club that has created a synthetic version of his elixir. He teams with Midnighter to free the captured animals and bring down the hunters.

DC Rebirth
Freedom Beast appears in Justice League of America vol. 5 #11, when Killer Frost and the Atom travel to Africa to ask him to help cure Killer Frost's condition.

See also
 African characters in comics

References

External links
World of Black Heroes: Freedom Beast Biography
Museum of Black Superheroes entry

DC Comics superheroes
Comics characters introduced in 1989
DC Comics characters with superhuman strength
DC Comics characters with accelerated healing
Characters created by Grant Morrison
African superheroes
Fictional South African people
DC Comics metahumans
DC Comics characters who have mental powers
DC Comics telepaths